Rochdale Castle was a motte-and-bailey castle in Rochdale, Greater Manchester, England. It was built in the period shortly after the Norman conquest of England.

In the 12th century many charters refer to 'the vill of the castle of Rachedal'. A charter dated c.1238 gave details of the castle standing on rising ground commanding the valley of the Roche and still known as Castle Hill. The castle was abandoned in the early 13th century. It was documented in 1322.

In 1626 a Gabriel Tayor had a house, known as Castle Hill, on the site, described as being on the 'reputed site of a castle standing there, but now clean defaced'. Buildings have been erected over the castle bailey and in the 19th century a house was built on the motte.

The defences consisted of an earth rampart and ditch.

See also
Castles in Greater Manchester

References

Bibliography

Castles in Lancashire
Buildings and structures in Rochdale
Castles in Greater Manchester